The 1928 Catholic University Cardinals football team was an American football team that represented the Catholic University of America as an independent during the 1928 college football season. In their fourth season under head coach John B. McAuliffe, the Cardinals compiled a 4–5 record.

Schedule

References

Catholic University
Catholic University Cardinals football seasons
Catholic University Cardinals football